Puerta de Arganda is a station of the Metro Madrid. It is located in fare Zone A of the CRTM.

Due to it being the southern endpoint of Line 9A, it serves as an interchange station to both Line 9B towards Rivas-Vaciamadrid and Arganda del Rey and via Vicálvaro railway station to the Cercanías service (lines C-2, C-7 and C-8. Connecting bus lines include 4, 71, 100, E3, T23 and the night line N7.

The name of the above-ground Cercanías station is Vicálvaro instead of Puerta de Arganda, although there also is a distinct Metro Vicálvaro.

History
The underground metro station was opened to the public on 1 December 1998, when line 9 was extended to the south, with the remaining section toward Arganda del Rey being inaugurated on 7 April 1999.

During the first few years of operation, one out of every three or four trains from the old terminus Herrera Oria passed through Puerta de Arganda in the direction of Arganda del Rey, with the rest reversing their course, until the CRTM separated the line into two sections, the latter operated under concession by TFM.

The station has two platforms and two tracks with one platform located in the middle to ensure a smooth passage between trains of the two sections.

References

Weblinks
Official page of Metro Madrid 
Map of the Metro network 

Line 9 (Madrid Metro) stations
Railway stations in Spain opened in 1998
Buildings and structures in Vicálvaro District, Madrid